Augusta High School is a public secondary school in Augusta, Kansas, United States, operated by Augusta USD 402 school district, and located at 2020 Ohio Street. The school mascot is the oriole and the school's colors are black and orange. The school competes in the Ark Valley Chisholm Trail League.

Notable alumni
 Madelyn Payne Dunham, maternal grandmother of U.S. President Barack Obama, graduated from the school in 1940.

See also

 List of high schools in Kansas
 List of unified school districts in Kansas

References

Public high schools in Kansas
Schools in Butler County, Kansas